Middle Vaal WMA. or Middle Vaal Water Management Area (coded: 9), Includes the following major rivers: the Vet River, Vals River and Vaal River, and covers the following Dams:

 Allemanskraal Dam Sand River 
 Bloemhof Dam Vaal River 
 Elandskuil Dam Swartleegte River 
 Erfenis Dam Vet River 
 Koppies Dam Renoster River 
 Rietspruit Dam Rietspruit

Boundaries 
Tertiary drainage regions C24, C25, C41 to C43, C60 and C70.

References 
http://www.dwaf.gov.za/Hydrology/

Water Management Areas
Dams in South Africa